Kokna is a river of Poland, a tributary of the Drawa near Złocieniec.

Rivers of Poland
Rivers of West Pomeranian Voivodeship